Clappers is/was a New York-based reggae label that was formed by Lister Hewan-Lowe in 1980.

The label released music by artists such as Yabby You, General Plow, Jah Malla, Nicodemus and Jack Ruby. Many of the albums from the Clappers label are today sought after by many reggae collectors.

The Clappers label also released the first political hip hop song in 1980 with Brother D's How We Gonna Make the Black Nation Rise? 12".

External links
 Official site

American record labels
Reggae record labels